The Pentecostal Alliance of Independent Churches is a Pentecostal Christian denomination in Sweden. It is a member of the Pentecostal World Fellowship. Daniel Alm from Västerås is General Superintendent since 2016, preceded by Pelle Hörnmark, and before him, Sten-Gunnar Hedin.

History 
The movement has its origins in the establishment of the first Pentecostal Church in Stockholm in 1910.

In 2001, the Pentecostal Alliance of Independent Churches was founded. 

In 2017, the denomination had 439 churches and 87,392 members.

PMU Interlife
PMU Interlife is a non-governmental humanitarian organization established by the Pentecostal Alliance in 1965 and originally called Pentecostal Mission's Third World Aid. PMU Interlife manages international development efforts with the support of Sida agency.

See also 
Swedish Pentecostal Movement

References

External links
 official website 

Pentecostal denominations in Europe